The Nepal national under-19 cricket team represents Nepal in under-19 international cricket. It is governed by Cricket Association of Nepal (CAN), which is an associate member of International Cricket Council (ICC).

Nepal has historically been one of the strongest associate members at the Under-19 Cricket World Cup, qualifying on seven occasions and twice advancing to the second round (in 2000 and 2016). The team has recorded World Cup victories against many full member teams.

Overview 
At its height, Nepal Under-19 team became Plate Champions of 2006 ICC Under-19 Cricket World Cup defeating a Test Nation New Zealand by 1 wicket at Paikiasothy Saravanamuttu Stadium, Sri Lanka on 18 Feb 2006. The team is also two-time finalist of Plate Championship, respectively in 2002 and 2008.  Out of nine U-19 World Cup Cricket tournament, Nepal has participated in six (2000, 2002, 2004, 2006, 2008 and 2012). They qualified for the 2012 ICC Under-19 Cricket World Cup after an impressive second-place finish, behind only Scotland and ahead of hosts Ireland at the 10-team World Cup qualifying tournament. Nepal did not qualify for the tournament in 1998, 2010 & 2014. Whereas in the first U-19 world cup in 1988 Nepal was not the member of ACC.

On Asian level Nepal U-19 team plays on ACC U-19 Elite Cup which is senior level of ACC Under-19 Cup and which is also the first level qualification tournament of ICC Under-19 Cricket World Cup Qualifier. Out of Eight tournaments Nepal is four times winner of tournament as in 2001, 2003, 2005, 2007 and two times finalist as in 1999 and 2011. In 1997 and 2009 Nepal could not make it to final. Unluckily Nepal U-19 cricket team didn't qualify for 2014 ICC Under-19 Cricket World Cup. Nepal qualified for the 2016 ICC Under-19 Cricket World Cup after winning the 2015 ICC Under-19 Cricket World Cup Qualifier.

In 2016 Under-19 Cricket World Cup, there were some concerns about the eligibility of Nepal's captain, Raju Rijal, with reports stating he was over 19 years of age. However, the ICC were satisfied that his date of birth was correct. As a result, Nepal finished in 8th position, Which is their best result in U-19 World cup along with the result in 2000 U-19 world cup .

Tournament history

Under-19 World Cup

Under-19 World Cup Qualifier

ACC Under-19 Championship

ACC Under-19 Asia Cup

Records
All records listed are for under-19 One Day International (ODI) matches only.

Team records

Highest totals
 238/7 (50 overs), v. , at Khan Shaheb Osman Ali Stadium, Fatullah, 28 January 2016
 234/8 (50 overs), v. , at Nondescripts Cricket Club, Colombo, 9 February 2006
 219/7 (50 overs), v. , at Peter Burge Oval, Brisbane, 21 August 2012
 214/8 (50 overs), v. , at Nondescripts Cricket Club, Colombo, 16 February 2006
 211/9 (50 overs), v. , at Shere Bangla National Stadium, Mirpur, 5 February 2016

Lowest totals
 74 (25.3 overs), v. , at Bayuemas Oval, Kuala Lumpur, 1 March 2008
 79 (27.3 overs), v. , at Peter Burge Oval, Brisbane, 20 August 2012
 82 (23.5 overs), v. , at Tony Ireland Stadium, Townsville, 13 August 2012
 89 (34.2 overs), v. , at Tyronne Fernando Stadium, Moratuwa, 20 January 2000
 107 (44.3 overs), v. , at Asgiriya Stadium, Kandy, 16 January 2000

Individual records

Most career runs
 537 – Kanishka Chaugai (2002-2006)
 385 – Sharad Vesawkar (2004-2006)
 300 – Paras Khadka (2004-2008)
 287 – Shakti Gauchan (2002-2004)
 231 – Bardan Chalise (2002)

Highest individual scores
 98* (76 balls) – Pradeep Airee, v. , at Peter Burge Oval, Brisbane, 21 August 2012
 90* (124 balls) – Kanishka Chaugai, v. , at Zahur Ahmed Chowdhury Stadium, Chittagong, 22 February 2004
 82* (116 balls) – Sharad Vesawkar, v. , at Nondescripts Cricket Club, Colombo, 9 February 2006
 82 (121 balls) – Sharad Vesawkar, v. , at MA Aziz Stadium, Chittagong, 15 February 2004
 80* (126 balls) – Shakti Gauchan, v. , at MA Aziz Stadium, Chittagong, 19 February 2004

Most career wickets
 23 – Rahul Vishwakarma (2008-2012), Paras Khadka (2004-2008)
 20 – Binod Das (2000-2002), Lakpa Lama (2002-2004)
 19 – Manjeet Shrestha (2002-2004)

Best bowling performances
 6/3 (6.2 overs) – Rahul Vishwakarma, v. , at Peter Burge Oval, Brisbane, 23 August 2012
 5/21 (7.3 overs) – Bhuvan Karki, v. , at Peter Burge Oval, Brisbane, 21August 2012
 5/27 (10 overs) – Sandeep Lamichhane, v. , at Khan Shaheb Osman Ali Stadium, Fatullah, 30 January 2016
 4/14 (10 overs) – Lakpa Lama, v. , at Hagley Park No 2, Christchurch, 25 January 2002
 4/15 (10 overs) – Manjeet Shrestha, v. , at Zahur Ahmed Chowdhury Stadium, Chittagong, 18 February 2004

Results summary

Current squad 

The following list contains the 15 players in the final squad for the ICC Under-19 Men's Cricket World Cup Asia Division 1 Qualifier, 2023.

See also 
 Nepal national cricket team
 2006 U-19 World Cup
 Cricket Association of Nepal
 National League Cricket (Nepal)

References 

Cricket teams in Nepal
C
Under-19 cricket teams
1998 establishments in Nepal
Nepal in international cricket